This is a list of caves in Switzerland.
Grotte aux Fées
Hölloch Cave (second longest cave in Europe)
Siebenhengste-Hohgant-Höhle
St. Beatus Caves
Wildkirchli

 
Switzerland
Caves